Botcha Appalanarasayya, also spelled Botcha Appala Narsaiah, is an Indian politician from the state of Andhra Pradesh. He was elected as the Member of the Legislative Assembly (MLA) from Gajapathinagaram Assembly constituency in 2019 on behalf of YSR Congress Party (YSRCP) and also served as the MLA during 2009–2014 on behalf of Indian National Congress.

Early life 
Botcha Appalanarasayya was born to Gurunaidu and Eswaramma. He has 6 brothers, of whom Botsa Satyanarayana is the eldest and the others younger, and 4 sisters. He is a relative of Baddukonda Appala Naidu. He graduated from Gitam College, Visakhapatnam in 1985.

Career 
Appalanarasayya contested the 2009 Andhra Pradesh Legislative Assembly election from Gajapathinagaram constituency on behalf of Congress and won as the MLA. He later contested the 2014 elections but lost the election. However, he and his brother Satyanarayana were the only two candidates, out of 175 Congress candidates contested in the 2014 elections held for all the 175 constituencies, who were able to retain deposits. He left Congress and joined YSRCP in June 2015. He then contested the 2019 elections and won as the MLA.

References 

Living people
Year of birth missing (living people)
People from Vizianagaram district
YSR Congress Party politicians
Indian National Congress politicians from Andhra Pradesh
Andhra Pradesh MLAs 2009–2014
Andhra Pradesh MLAs 2019–2024